Glaucocharis dilatella is a moth of the family Crambidae described by Edward Meyrick in 1879. It is known from Australia, including South Australia, Tasmania, Queensland, New South Wales and Victoria.

The wingspan is about 15 mm. Adults have cream forewings, each with brown mottling and a row of black and orange spots along the margin. The hindwings are pale brown.

References

Moths described in 1879
Diptychophorini